Uranothauma nguru is a butterfly in the family Lycaenidae. It is found in Tanzania from the eastern part of the country to the Nguru Mountains.

References

Endemic fauna of Tanzania
Butterflies described in 1985
Uranothauma